Fort Juniper was a fort that existed from 1775 in Salem, Massachusetts during the American Revolutionary War. It was also known as Fort Number One during its existence.

See also
 List of military installations in Massachusetts

References

Juniper
Juniper
Salem, Massachusetts
1775 establishments in Massachusetts